England under-19 may refer to:
 English U-19 cricket team
 England national under-19 football team